In geometry, the elongated pentagonal rotunda is one of the Johnson solids (J21). As the name suggests, it can be constructed by elongating a pentagonal rotunda (J6) by attaching a decagonal prism to its base. It can also be seen as an elongated pentagonal orthobirotunda (J42) with one pentagonal rotunda removed.

Formulae
The following formulae for volume and surface area can be used if all faces are regular, with edge length a:

Dual polyhedron 

The dual of the elongated pentagonal rotunda has 30 faces: 10 isosceles triangles, 10 rhombi, and 10 quadrilaterals.

References

External links
 

Johnson solids